Artur Serhiiovych Lohai (born 12 September 1993) is a Ukrainian actor and singer the best known acting in reality television show Kiev Day and Night, portraying in real name character. He was The X Factor contestant in 2014.

Early life and career 
Artur Lohai was born on 12 September 1993 in Vesele, Zaporizhzhia Oblast, Ukraine. He studied international tourism in Zaporizhzhia National Technical University for two years. In his early age, Artur enjoyed listening music of various musicians such as Adam Levine of Maroon 5, Sviatoslav Vakarchuk, John Newman, James Arthur, Ivan Dorn and Eminem. Artur aspired to participate in The X Factor and to become a singer. Artur returned to Kyiv and participated to Ukrainian version X Factor from August to November 2014. 

Categorized into Georgian singer Nino Katamadze, Artur included TOP-12, and took 12th position. In 2017, Artur played in Millennium Theatre portraying as Bruno in the play of Thirst, based on novel "Camera Obscura" by Vladimir Nabokov. He rose to prominence in the 2016 reality soap opera Kiev Day and Night, taking his real name in the character.

He began casting several films since 2019: such as Secrets, Big Uncles and Community. Artur also portrayed as Andrii Vasylenko in 2020 drama series To Catch the Kaidash. He portrayed as a supporting role.

Personal life 
Artur has dated Kiev Day and Night co-star Yevheniia Lohai, which she appeared as role of Diana in season 4. They were married in May 2018 and together have two children, Lev Lohai and Herman Lohai.

Filmography

Television and film

References

External links 

 

1993 births
Living people
Ukrainian male stage actors
Ukrainian male television actors
21st-century Ukrainian male actors